Marián Jirout (born 23 July 1976 in Pardubice, Czechoslovakia) is a former motorcycle speedway from the Czech Republic.

Career
Jirout rode in the 1999 Speedway Grand Prix. In Britain, he raced with the Peterborough Panthers for five seasons from 1995 to 2001.

Following a car accident in January 2003 he was almost left paralysed but he eventually recovered. 

In October 2007, during the Zlatá přilba race in Pardubice, he broke three vertebrae in a fall and decided to end career of rider.

Family
His father Jiří Jirout (1953–2000), also a speedway rider, won a silver medal in the 1979 Team Ice Racing World Championship.

Results

Speedway Grand Prix

World Championships 
 Team World Championship (Speedway World Team Cup and Speedway World Cup)
 1998 -  Vojens - 5th place (5 points)
 2000 - 3rd place in Semi-Final A
 2001 -  - 7th place (4th place in Race-off)

European Championships 
 European Club Champions' Cup
 2000 -  Piła - 4th place (3 points)
 2002 -  Pardubice - Runner-up (6 points)

See also 
 Czech Republic national speedway team
 List of Speedway Grand Prix riders

References 

1976 births
Living people
Czech speedway riders
Sportspeople from Pardubice
Mildenhall Fen Tigers riders
Peterborough Panthers riders
Somerset Rebels riders